Diocese of Jabalpur may refer to:
Roman Catholic Diocese of Jabalpur
Diocese of Jabalpur (Church of North India)